Marco Sánchez (born 18 January 1970) is a Puerto Rican wrestler. He competed in the men's Greco-Roman 62 kg at the 1996 Summer Olympics.

References

External links
 

1970 births
Living people
Puerto Rican male sport wrestlers
Olympic wrestlers of Puerto Rico
Wrestlers at the 1996 Summer Olympics
Place of birth missing (living people)